Macquarie Fields, an electoral district of the Legislative Assembly in the Australian state of New South Wales, has had two incarnations, the first from 1988 to 1991, the second from 1999. It has always been held by the Labor party.


Members

Election results

Elections in the 2010s

2019

2015

2011

Elections in the 2000s

2007

2005 by-election

2003

Elections in the 1990s

1999

1991 - 1999
District abolished

1990 by-election

Elections in the 1980s

1988

References

New South Wales state electoral results by district